"Don't Blow Your Top" is a KMFDM song from the album of the same name. It was originally released as a 12" single in 1988. In 2008, KMFDM Records re-released it as a 7" vinyl single, limited to 250 copies.  It was also included on the singles compilation album, Extra, Vol. 1.

Track listing

1988 release

2008 7" reissue

1989 songs
1989 singles
KMFDM songs
Wax Trax! Records singles
Songs written by Sascha Konietzko